"How Can I Be Sure" is a popular song written by Felix Cavaliere and Eddie Brigati, and originally recorded by the Young Rascals for their 1967 album Groovin' with a single release in August 1967 affording the group their fourth Top 10 hit peaking at #4.

"How Can I Be Sure" reached #4 on the Hot 100 in Billboard in October 1967, ranking as the most successful (Young) Rascals' hit featuring a lead vocal by Eddie Brigati. The single's B-side, "I'm So Happy Now" (also included on the Groovin album), was written and sung by Rascals guitarist Gene Cornish. Featuring a unique guitar phase-out ending, it was the first Cornish-penned 
song to appear on a Rascals single.

Background
Of a rock-oriented band such as the (Young) Rascals introducing a traditional pop-style song such as "How Can I Be Sure" Cavaliere has stated: "The only reason we were brave enough to do that was [that] the Beatles did 'Michelle' and 'Yesterday'." (Cavaliere had an especial awareness of the Beatles, having toured Europe with them in 1963 when he was a member of Joey Dee and the Starliters; the Rascals would also open for the Beatles at Shea Stadium 15 August 1965). The track features the sounds of a trumpet, bass, piano, drums, and strings, suggesting the sounds of cabaret music as well as a concertina, chosen so as to add to the song the vibe of a French café. The song's musical styles include blue-eyed soul and pop. 

"How Can I Be Sure" was one of several songs inspired by group founder Felix Cavaliere's girlfriend Adrienne Becchuri, a Pelham (New York) high school student Cavaliere met in 1966, the year he turned 24: (Felix Cavaliere quote:) "I fell madly in love with this woman who actually turned out to be a muse...[R]eally the only reason she was in my life [was to] spark that kind of emotion and feeling that generates those types of songs." Cavaliere and Buccheri remained a couple for a year, with Cavaliere first celebrating Buccheri in the blissful Rascals' hits "Groovin' and "A Girl Like You", and then with the introspective "How Can I Be Sure" expressing doubts about the relationship — he and Buccheri had recently become engaged — and despite the positive resolution of the song Cavaliere did in fact discover that she was too young ((Felix Cavaliere quote:)"I woke up one day and said: 'What the hell am I doing? I'm going out with a kid.).

Chart performance

Weekly charts

Year-end charts

Dusty Springfield version

"How Can I Be Sure" was covered by British singer Dusty Springfield and released as a non-LP single in September 1970. It was rumoured that this recording and single release may have been prompted by her well received performance of the song on the Des O'Connor Show in May 1970. Dusty was hopeful that this single would fare better than her then-recent American recordings which were met with relative indifference in the UK (aside from the US and UK Top 10 hit "Son of a Preacher Man").

Despite several promotional television and radio appearances and glowing reviews from the press, the single only spent one week in the UK Top 40 and only four weeks total on the chart. The song was issued specifically for the British market and would not be issued in America until the release of The Dusty Springfield Anthology in 1997.

Track listing
Side A: "How Can I Be Sure" (2:47)	
Side B: "Spooky" (2:44)

"Spooky" is a cover of the Classics IV hit and was recorded in January 1968 but left unused for almost three years until it featured as the B-side to this single.

Charts

David Cassidy version

Background
In 1972 "How Can I Be Sure" was recorded for the album Rock Me Baby by David Cassidy (David Cassidy quote:) "Eddie Brigati and Felix Cavaliere [were] two of the great musical influences of my teenage years [when] I thought [the Rascals] were just about the best American pop band...[That song] brought back so many memories of that [time] for me." (Another Rascals hit, the Cavaliere/Brigati composition "I've Been Lonely Too Long", was also remade by Cassidy for Rock Me Baby; concurrent with the album's recording, Cassidy's producer Wes Farrell would acquire ownership of the entire Rascals song catalogue.) Released as the album's first single, "How Can I Be Sure" became the second of Cassidy's three Top 30 solo hits on the Billboard Hot 100 with a peak of #25, Cassidy's third Top 30 hit (and fifth and final Top 40 hit) being "Lyin' to Myself" eighteen years later in 1990. On the Billboard Easy Listening chart "How Can I Be Sure" peaked at #3.

"How Can I Be Sure" would afford Cassidy a #1 hit on both the Irish Singles Chart and (for two weeks) the singles chart for the UK, being the second of Cassidy's overall 11 UK chart hits, six of which would reach the Top Ten, including his second #1 UK hit: the double A-side hit "Daydreamer"/"The Puppy Song" (#1 for three weeks in 1973). "How Can I Be Sure" also charted with more moderate impact in Australia (#16), Canada (#22), Germany (#33), and the Netherlands (#13).

Track listing
Side A: "How Can I Be Sure" (2:52)	
Side B: "Ricky's Tune" (3:24)

Chart history

Weekly charts

Year-end charts

Other versions
In late 1967, American singer Lesley Gore recorded a version for her 8th studio album, Magic Colors. Intended to be released that December, the project was instead shelved, and would remain unreleased until 2011.  
In 1967 French singer Nicoletta sold two million copies of the song, rendered as "Je ne pense qu'à t'aimer", the version which subsequently inspired Dusty Springfield's version.
Also in 1967 a distinct French-language rendering, "A Paris la Nuit", was recorded by Quebec singer Michel Pagliaro with his band Les Chanceliers.
Daryl Braithwaite released a version in October 1994 as the lead from his album Six Moons: The Best of 1988–1994. It peaked in Australia at #55 on the ARIA charts.

 Frank Shiner on his 2017 album “Lonely Town, Lonely Street”: Frank performed his version live with Young Rascals original founding member Gene Cornish at three concerts

References

1967 singles
1970 singles
1972 singles
The Rascals songs
Dusty Springfield songs
David Cassidy songs
RPM Top Singles number-one singles
UK Singles Chart number-one singles
Irish Singles Chart number-one singles
Songs written by Felix Cavaliere
Songs written by Eddie Brigati
1967 songs
Atlantic Records singles
Bell Records singles
Philips Records singles
Stax Records singles
Song recordings produced by Wes Farrell